The discography of Remy Ma consists of one studio album, one collaborative album, five mixtapes and twelve singles.

Albums

Studio albums

Collaboration albums

Mixtapes

Singles

As lead artist

As featured artist

Guest appearances

Notes

References

External links
 

Discographies of American artists
Hip hop discographies